The Love Mask is a 1916 American drama silent film directed by Frank Reicher and written by Cecil B. DeMille and Jeanie MacPherson. The film stars Cleo Ridgely, Wallace Reid, Earle Foxe, Bob Fleming, Dorothy Abril and Lucien Littlefield. The film was released on April 13, 1916, by Paramount Pictures.

Plot

Cast 
Cleo Ridgely as Kate Kenner
Wallace Reid as Dan Derring
Earle Foxe as Silver Spurs
Bob Fleming as Jim
Dorothy Abril as Estrella
Lucien Littlefield

References

External links 
 

1916 films
1910s English-language films
Silent American drama films
1916 drama films
Paramount Pictures films
American black-and-white films
American silent feature films
Films directed by Frank Reicher
1910s American films